Rufus (born 19 December 1942) or Zio Vittorio is the stage name of Italian-French actor Jacques Narcy. He is  best known to international film audiences for his performance as Raphaël, the father of Amélie Poulain in Amélie (2001).

Career
After three years at medical school, he became a theatre manager.

He has appeared in numerous French TV series and productions, including most of the films directed by Jean-Pierre Jeunet. He played the lead role in the movie Train de vie (1998), an award-winning tragicomedy about the Holocaust.

Personal life
He lives in Neauphle-le-Château in the Yvelines département and has three children; his daughter Zoé Narcy and his son Basile Narcy are themselves actors.

Filmography

References

External links

1942 births
Living people
20th-century French male actors
21st-century French male actors
Commandeurs of the Ordre des Arts et des Lettres
French male film actors
French male stage actors
French male television actors
French male writers
People from Riom